Michael C. Constantinou is an American structural engineer who is a Samuel P. Capen Professor and State University of New York Distinguished Professor in the Department of Civil, Structural and Environmental Engineering at the University at Buffalo. He also serves an editor of the Journal of Earthquake Engineering and Structural Dynamics

Education
Constantinou earned a diploma in civil engineering from the University of Patras, Greece in 1980. He received is M.S. in civil engineering in 1981, and his Ph.D. in civil engineering in 1984, both from Rensselaer Polytechnic Institute.

Research career 
Constantinou is the inventor of the highly effective energy dissipation apparatus (US Patent 6,438,905), Negative stiffness device and method (US Patent 8,857,110), Negative stiffness device and method (US Patent 9,206,616) and Motion damping system designed for reducing obstruction within open spaces (US Patent 9,580,924).

Constantinou developed the toggle, scissor-jack and open-space damping systems introduced fluidic self-centering systems. He has contributed to the development of standards and guidance related to seismic protective systems, including the National Earthquake Hazards Reduction Program Recommended Provisions, American Society of Civil Engineers (ASCE) Standards 7 and 41, and the American Association of State Highway and Transportation Officials (AASHTO) Guide Specification for Seismic Isolation Design.

Honors and awards 
In 2019, Constantinou received an honorary doctorate from the University of Patras, the same University where he received his civil engineering diploma. He was also elected to Fellow status in the American Society of Civil Engineers in October of that year.

Since 2014, Constantinou has held the rank of State University of New York (SUNY) Distinguished Professor, the highest academic rank in the SUNY system. He received the Nathan M. Newmark Medal (2015) and the Moisseiff Award (2015) from the American Society of Civil Engineers (ASCE).

In 2005, Constantinou received the Charles Pankow Award for Innovation from ASCE and the Civil Engineering Research Foundation. He received the Grand Award from the American Council of Engineering Companies and the New York Association of Consulting Engineering Companies Diamond Award in 2002. In 1994, he received the General Services Administration Design Award. He also received the Presidential Young Investigator Award from the U.S. National Science Foundation in 1988

Selected papers 
Constantinou, M.C., Mokha, A.M. and Reinhorn, A.M., "Teflon bearings in base isolation. Part 2: Modeling," Journal of Structural Engineering, vol. 116, No. 2, 1990, 455-474.
Mokha, A., Constantinou, M.C., Reinhorn, A.M. and Zayas, V., "Experimental Study of Friction Pendulum isolation system," Journal of Structural Engineering, Vol. 117, No. 4, 1991, 1203-1219.
Constantinou, M.C. and Symans, M.D."Experimental and analytical investigation of seismic response of structures with supplemental fluid viscous dampers," Report No. NCEER-92-0032, National Center for Earthquake Engineering Research, Buffalo, NY, 1992.
Symans, M.D. and Constantinou, M.C., "Seismic testing of a buildings structure with a semi-active fluid damper control system," Earthquake Engineering and Structural Dynamics, Vol. 26, 1997, 759-777.
Constantinou, M.C., Tsopelas, P., Kasalanati, A. and Wolff, E.D., "Property modification factors for seismic isolation bearings," Report No. MCEER-99-0012, Multidisciplinary Center for Earthquake Engineering Research, Buffalo, NY, 199.
Fenz, D. and Constantinou, M.C., "Modeling triple Friction Pendulum bearings for response-history analysis," Earthquake Spectra, Vol. 24, No. 4, 2009, 1011-1028.
Kalpakidis, I.V. and Constantinou, M.C., "Effects of heating on the behavior of lead-rubber bearings. I: Theory," Journal of Structural Engineering, Vol. 135, No. 12, 2009, 1440-1449.
Pasala, D.T.R., Sarlis, A.A., Nagarajaiah, S., Reinhorn, A.M., Constantinou, M.C. and Taylor, D., "Adaptive negative stiffness: a new structural modification approach for seismic protection," Journal of Structural Engineering, Vol. 139, No. 7, 2013, 1112-1123.
Lee, D. and Constantinou, M.C., "Quintuple friction pendulum isolator-behavior, modeling and validation," Earthquake Spectra, Volume 32, No. 3, 2016, 1607-1626
Kitayama, S. and Constantinou, M.C., "Fluidic self-centering devices as elements of seismically-resistant structures: descriptions, testing, modeling and model validation," Journal of Structural Engineering, Vol. 143, No. 7, 2017
Lee, D. and Constantinou, M.C., "Combined horizontal-vertical seismic isolation system for high-voltage-power transformers: development, testing and validation," Bulletin of Earthquake Engineering, Vol. 16, Issue 9, 4273-4296, 2018.

External links

References 

1955 births
Living people
American structural engineers
Greek engineers
Greek emigrants to the United States
University of Patras alumni
Rensselaer Polytechnic Institute alumni
University at Buffalo faculty
People from Kyrenia
Engineering academics
20th-century American engineers
21st-century American engineers